Electoral history of John F. Kennedy, who served as the 35th president of the United States (1961–1963) and as a United States senator (1953–1960) and United States representative (1947–1953) from Massachusetts.

U.S. House of Representatives elections (1946–1950)

U.S. Senate elections (1952–1958)

Presidential elections (1956–1960) 

1960 United States presidential election:
 John F. Kennedy/Lyndon B. Johnson (D) – 34,220,984 (49.7%) and 303 electoral votes (22 states carried)
 Richard Nixon/Henry Cabot Lodge, Jr. (R) – 34,108,157 (49.5%) and 219 electoral votes (26 states carried)
 Harry F. Byrd/Strom Thurmond (I) – 286,359 (0.4%) and 14 electoral votes (2 states carried)
 Harry F. Byrd/Barry Goldwater (I) – 1 electoral vote (Oklahoma faithless elector)
 Orval E. Faubus/James G. Crommelin (States' Rights) – 44,984 (0.1%)

References

John F. Kennedy
Kennedy, John F.
Kennedy, John F.